Open University Malaysia, abbreviated as OUM, is the 7th Malaysian private university and it is owned by the Multimedia Technology Enhancement Operations (METEOR) Sdn. Bhd, a consortium of 11 Malaysian public universities. It leverages on the quality, prestige and capabilities of its consortium.

The main campus is at Menara OUM, Kelana Centre Point Kelana Jaya. In addition to this, there are more than 30 learning centres throughout Malaysia, out of which 10 are regional learning centres.

As the first open and distance learning university in the country, OUM initially opened to 753 learners in 2001. A decade later, OUM has over 100,000 students in more than 50 academic programmes. In 2023, the QS Stars had assessed OUM's online learning for three years and the university received a 5-Star rating.

Chancellors 
The vice-chancellor of OUM is Assoc Prof Dr Ahmad Izanee Awang. The first chancellor was the late Tun Endon Mahmood (the wife of fifth Prime Minister Tun Abdullah Badawi) who was appointed on 16 December 2004. On 8 December 2007, Tun Jeanne Abdullah was appointed as the new chancellor of OUM; the pro-chancellor is Tan Sri Azman Hashim who is also the executive chairman of Arab-Malaysian Corporation Berhad.

e-Learning methodology and tools

Open Entry
Open Entry refers to non-restrictive entry requirements for a degree programme, applicable to adults who possess learning experience which can be assessed and matched against the learning outcomes of an academic course.

Blended learning methodology
 Face-to face-learning: Tutorials are conducted at learning centres where learners have the opportunity to meet their tutors and discuss their subjects and their assignments
 e-Learning: Learners are required to participate in an online forum using a learning management system and discuss among each other and with their tutors and peers on their subject matter and their assignments.
 Self-managed learning module: Learners do not have to come over for their tutorials but they still need to come for their tests. They learn by participating in the learning management system and using their own modules.
 m-Learning: The learning materials are designed in downloadable formats that can be accessed using a desktop or laptop computer. Learners then opt to transfer these contents into a handphone to view them. One needs a handphone equipped with the necessary features. Examples include MOOCs and OER courses.

OUM has a strong network of learning centres nationwide. These learning centres are in major cities and towns, from Peninsular Malaysia to Sabah and Sarawak. OUM has more than 30 learning centres fully equipped with tutorial rooms, computer laboratories, library and Internet facilities.
 Modules are used by the students, tutors and subject-matter experts (SMEs). The modules are written by academicians from public and private universities in Malaysia.
 The Tan Sri Dr. Abdullah Sanusi Digital Library has more than 30,000 volumes of printed books in the main campus and learning centres nationwide. As for the digital collection, the online databases consist of more than 82,000 e-books and 32,000 e-journal titles. Other electronic collections include electronic theses, newspaper articles and legal acts.

Accreditation 
The following OUM programmes have been fully accredited by the Malaysian Qualifications Agency (MQA).
 Diploma in Information Technology
 Diploma in Management
 Diploma in Human Resource Management
 Diploma in Islamic Studies with Education
 Diploma in Early Childhood Education
 Diploma in Accounting
 Bachelor of Management with Honours
 Bachelor of Marketing with Honours
 Bachelor of Business Administration with Honours
 Bachelor of Human Resource Management with Honours
 Bachelor of Information Technology with Honours
 Bachelor of Communication with Honours
 Bachelor of Liberal Studies with Honours
 Bachelor of Political Science with Honours
 Bachelor of Education (TESL) with Honours
 Bachelor of Teaching (Primary Education) with Honours
 Bachelor of Early Childhood Education with Honours
 Bachelor of English Studies with Honours
 Bachelor of Nursing Science with Honours
 Bachelor of Technology Management with Honours
 Bachelor of Digital Media Design with Honours
 Bachelor of Accounting with Honours (Accredited by CPA Australia)
 Bachelor of Manufacturing Management with Honours
 Bachelor of Tourism Management with Honours
 Bachelor of Hospitality Management with Honours
 Bachelor of Medical and Health Sciences with Honours
 Bachelor of Occupational Safety and Health Management with Honours
 Bachelor of Psychology with Honours
 Bachelor of Islamic Studies (Islamic Management) with Honours
 Bachelor of Science in Project and Facility Management with Honours
 Master of Counselling
 Master of Psychology 
 Master of Information Technology
 Master of Management
 Master of Occupational Safety and Health Management
 Master of Education
 Master of Early Childhood Education
 Master of Corporate Communication
 Master of Business Administration
 Master of Information Technology
 Master of Management
 Master of Instructional Design and Technology
 Master of Project Management
 Master of Facility Management
 Master of Quality Management
 Master of Human Resource Management
 Master of Islamic Studies
 Master of English Studies
 Master of Nursing
 Doctor of Philosophy (Business Administration)
 Doctor of Philosophy (Education)
 Doctor of Philosophy (Science)
 Doctor of Philosophy (Information Technology)
 Doctor of Philosophy (Arts)
 Doctor of Education
 Doctor of Business Administration
 Doctor of Nursing
 Postgraduate Diploma in Teaching
 Postgraduate Diploma in Islamic Studies

Faculties 
 Faculty of Business and Management
 Faculty of Social Sciences and Humanities 
 Faculty of Education
 Faculty of Technology and Applied Sciences

Academic Support Centre 
Among the support centres are:
 Centre for Learner Affairs
 Centre for Instructional Design & Technology
 Centre for Research & Innovation
 Centre for Learning Technology
 Centre for Teaching & Learning Management
 Centre for Quality Assurance
 Centre for Research and Innovation
 Tan Sri Dr. Abdullah Sanusi Digital Library
 Accreditation of Prior Experiential Learning Centre
 OUM Graduate Centre

Notable alumni
Dato' Seri Saarani Mohamad - Bachelor of Human Resource Management with Honours, current Menteri Besar of Perak, politician.
Dr Soo Wincci- Phd in Business Administration, Miss World Malaysia 2008, International Recording Artiste, Actress, Composer, Host and Entrepreneur
Dato' Dr Anas Alam Faizli - PhD in Business Administration, CEO of Duopharma Biotech Berhad
 Dato Mohd Faizal bin Hj. Mohd Hassim - Bachelor of Banking and Finance with Honours, Founder and CEO of HRSB Holdings
Vanida Imran- Bachelor of Arts (English Studies) Honours, Miss World Malaysia 1993, Actress, Nona Host
Wardina Safiyyah- Bachelor of Psychology (Honours), Actress, Model, TV host
 Winson Voon - Master of Business Administration. Celebrity
 Daniel Lee Chee Hun - Master of Business Administration. Singer, second season Malaysian Idol winner.
 Brian Chen@Abang Brian - Master of Education. Master Chef Celebrity Malaysia and Radio DJ

References

External links 
 Official website of Open University Malaysia
 Official website of Multimedia Technology Enhancement Operations Sdn Bhd (METEOR)
 Article about Open University Malaysia
 UNESCO Asia Pacific Open and Distance Learning Knowledge Base
 Malaysian Ministry Of Higher Education
 OUM Sabah Learning Centre

See also 
 Malaysia Education
 Distance education
 Lifelong learning

Universities and colleges in Kuala Lumpur
Open universities
Educational institutions established in 2000
2000 establishments in Malaysia
Distance education institutions based in Malaysia
Business schools in Malaysia
Information technology schools in Malaysia
Private universities and colleges in Malaysia